Jean-Louis Léonard (born 24 July 1950 in Besançon (Doubs) is a French politician and a member of the Union for a Popular Movement (UMP).

A mayor of Châtelaillon-Plage from 1984 to 1995 and again since 1996, he has been a 16th vice-president of the Agglomeration community of La Rochelle since March 2008.

A former municipal councillor of La Rochelle (1995-1996), he represented two constituencies in the National Assembly of France : Charente-Maritime's 1st constituency (1993−1997) and Charente-Maritime's 2nd constituency (2002−2012).

Political career (1983−present)

Local elections

Successful implantation: Châtelaillon-Plage and canton of Aytré
Engineer by profession, Jean-Louis Léonard began his political career on the occasion of the 1983 municipal elections. A member of the Rally for the Republic (RPR), he became a deputy mayor of Châtelaillon-Plage. In 1984, he succeeded the then mayor Paul Michaud after his death. In the 1989 municipal elections, he was re-elected as a mayor of Châtelaillon-Plage. After his resignation as a municipal councillor of La Rochelle, he was again elected as a mayor of Châtelaillon-Plage on 21 November 1996. He was re-elected as a mayor in the 2001 and 2008 municipal elections.

He has been a 16th vice-president of the Agglomeration community of La Rochelle since March 2008. In relations with the Charente-Maritime's general council, he is in charge of the direction schedule and tourist development thread.

In the 1988 cantonal elections, he was elected as a general councillor of Aytré succeeding Léon Belly (PCF). Re-elected as a general councillor of Aytré in 1994 and 2001, he has been a vice-president of the Charente-Maritime's general council between 1994 and 2002; during eight years, he was in charge of economics. On 24 August 2002, he resigned as a general councillor because of the law of accumulation of mandates ("Cumul des mandats").

Unsuccessful implantation: La Rochelle
Encouraged by his success in the 1993 legislative election, he left the municipality of Châtelaillon-Plage and faced Michel Crépeau, then mayor of La Rochelle, in the 1995 municipal election. Polling 29%, his municipal list was overwhelmingly defeated by the miscellaneous left list of Michel Crépeau (58.02%). A municipal councillor of La Rochelle since 18 June 1995, he resigned on 15 October 1996.

National elections

MP of La Rochelle (1993-1997)
In the 1993 legislative election, Jean-Louis Léonard defeated Michel Crépeau, mayor of La Rochelle since 1971 and MP of the Charente-Maritime's 1st constituency since 1973. A Member of the Parliament during four years, he did not run in this constituency in the 1997 legislative election.

MP of Rochefort (2002-2012)
In 2002, the Union for a Popular Movement (UMP) gained the Charente-Maritime's 2nd constituency, which had been won in 1997 by the socialist Bernard Grasset.

In the 2002 legislative election, he was a candidate in the Charente-Maritime's 2nd constituency (Rochefort and a part of Aunis). In the first round, he polled 38.45% (19,970 votes) whereas his socialist opponent André Bonnin got 29.88% (15,519 votes). In the run-off, he defeated André Bonnin (46.45%, 23,132 votes) and was largely elected with 53.55% (26,671 votes) as an MP of this constituency. In Châtelaillon-Plage, he largely got the absolute majority in the first-round (56.83%) and polled 65.50% in the run-off.

In the 2007 legislative election, he narrowly kept his seat in the run-off.

In the first round, he polled 42.98% (23,432 votes) whereas his socialist opponent André Bonnin got 29.99% (16,351 votes). In the run-off, he polled 50.20% (27,321 votes) whereas André Bonnin got 49.80% (27,101 votes). The gap consisted of only 220 votes between the two candidates. In Châtelaillon-Plage, he largely got the absolute majority in the first round (60.15%) and polled 65.48% in the run-off.

In the 2012 legislative election, he was defeated by the socialist candidate Suzanne Tallard, mayor of Aytré since 2008.

In the first round, he came first with 34.22% (19,238 votes) whereas his socialist opponent polled 31.50% (17,711 votes). In the run-off, he achieved 47.01% (26,391 votes) and was defeated by Suzanne Tallard (52.99%, 29,752 votes). In Châtelaillon-Plage, he largely got the absolute majority in the first round (57.00%) and achieved 63.08% in the run-off whereas in Aytré Suzanne Tallard polled 40.43% in the first round and largely got the absolute majority in the run-off (61.36%).

Political mandates

Local mandates
 Mayor of Châtelaillon-Plage: 17 December 1984 – 18 June 1995; since 21 November 1996
 16th vice-president of the Agglomeration community of La Rochelle: since March 2008

Former local mandates
 Municipal councillor of La Rochelle: 18 June 1995 – 15 October 1996
 General councillor of Aytré: 3 October 1988 – 24 August 2002
 Vice-president of the Charente-Maritime's general council (28 March 1994 – 24 August 2002): in charge of economics

National mandate
 MP of the Charente-Maritime's 2nd constituency (19 June 2002−19 June 2012) : Union for a Popular Movement parliamentary group, member of the committee of defence (2002−2007), member of the committee of economics (2007−2012), president of the friendship group France/Poland (2002−2012)

Former national mandate
 MP of the Charente-Maritime's 1st constituency: 28 March 1993 – 21 April 1997

References

External links
 Official website
 Jean-Louis Léonard's official biography, French National Assembly

1950 births
Living people
Politicians from Besançon
Rally for the Republic politicians
Union for a Popular Movement politicians
Deputies of the 10th National Assembly of the French Fifth Republic
Deputies of the 12th National Assembly of the French Fifth Republic
Deputies of the 13th National Assembly of the French Fifth Republic
Chevaliers of the Légion d'honneur
Members of Parliament for Charente-Maritime